Zinsmeyer Academy was a private school in Long Beach, California. The school was owned by the non-profit organization Childnet.

References

External links

Private schools in California